Essert may refer to the following places:

In France

Essert, Territoire de Belfort
Essert-Romand, in the Haute-Savoie département

In Switzerland

Essert, Switzerland, in the Canton of Fribourg
Essert-Pittet, in the Canton of Vaud
Essert-sous-Champvent, in the Canton of Vaud